Myopitora shatalkini is a species of tephritid or fruit flies in the genus Myopitora of the family Tephritidae.

Distribution
Russia

References

Tephritinae
Insects described in 1991
Diptera of Asia